Chris Roberson may refer to:

 Chris Roberson (author), American science fiction author and publisher
 Chris Roberson (baseball) (born 1979), American baseball outfielder
 Chris Roberson (American football) (born 1983), American football cornerback

See also
Chris Robertson (disambiguation)